The 2003–04 VB-Series was a cricket tri-series involving touring nations India and Zimbabwe and hosts Australia. Australia won the tournament, who lost one match in the group stage, by defeating India in the 2-match final. Adam Gilchrist was named Man of the Series for his 498 runs at an average of 62.25.

Group stage

Table

Key
BP = Bonus points.
1 bonus point was awarded to the winning team if their run rate was 1.25x than that of the losing team.
CP = Consolation points
1 consolation point was awarded to the losing team if they denied the winning team from receiving the bonus point.

Points system
Won = 5 points
Lost = 0 points
Tie or No result = 3 points
Standard net run rate rules applied.

Position deciders
The deciding factors, in order, on table position were:
Total points
Games won
Head-to-head result
Bonus points
Net run rate

Matches

Match 1: Australia v India

Ajit Agarkar recorded his first 5 wicket haul, and his best career ODI figures to date.

Match 2: Australia v Zimbabwe

Brad Williams took his second 5 wicket haul, and recorded his best bowling figures with his 5/22.

Match 3: India v Zimbabwe

Match 4: Australia v Zimbabwe

Gilchrist's 172 is his personal highest score in both One Day Internationals and List A cricket. It was also the highest score by a wicket-keeper in ODI cricket until Mahendra Singh Dhoni's 183* in 2005.

Match 5: Australia v India

Match 6: India v Zimbabwe

Match 7: Australia v India

Match 8: India v Zimbabwe

Match 9: Australia v Zimbabwe

Match 10: Australia v Zimbabwe

Match 11: Australia v India

Match 12: India v Zimbabwe

Final series

First final

Second final

Gallery

See also
Indian cricket team in Australia in 2003–04
Zimbabwean cricket team in Australia in 2003–04

References

External links 
 Tournament home at ESPNcricinfo
 

VB Series
VB Series
Australian Tri-Series
International cricket competitions in 2003–04
2004 in Indian cricket
2004 in Zimbabwean cricket